Zhangshanying Town is a town in the Yanqing District of Beijing. It shares border with Dahaituo Township in the north, Jiuxian and Shenjiaying Towns in the east, Yanqing Town in the south, and Beixinpu Town in the west. As of 2020, Zhangshanying had a population of 24,249.

Its name Zhangshanying originated in 1644, when Li Zicheng stationed his troops in Zhang Mountain after he entered Beijing. 

Inside the area of the town is the Guyaju Caves and the nearby village of Dongmenying; also within the area of the town is the West Dazhuangke village, the host settlement of the Yanqing cluster of 2022 Winter Olympics.

Geography 
Zhangshanying Town is on the south of Yan Mountain Range, and the Mount Haituo on its northern border with Hebei is the 2nd tallest mountain in Beijing, with a peak elevation of 2,241 meters.

Datong–Qinhuangdao railway, National Highway 110 and Kangzhuang-Zhangjiakou Highway all pass through the town.

History

Administrative divisions 
As of the year 2021, Zhangshanying Town consisted of 34 subdivisions, including these 2 communities and 32 villages:

Landmarks 

 Guyaju Caves
 Songshan National Nature Reserve

Gallery

See also 

 List of township-level divisions of Beijing

References

Yanqing District
Towns in Beijing